Anders Rønnow Klarlund born 1971, is a Danish author, director and screenwriter. Together they have published The Last Good Man and "The Sleep and The Death".

Books

The Last Good Man by A. J. Kazinski 
A. J. Kazinski is a pseudonym for Anders Rønnow Klarlund and Jakob Weinreich, they have published the book The Last Good Man (Den sidste gode mand (2010)

The book has been translated into: English, Italian, German, French, Dutch, Norwegian, Hungarian, Russian, Finnish, Swedish, Japanese, Korean, Spanish, Polish, Portuguese, Romanian, Greek and Icelandic .

Awards 

“The 2011 French Prix Relay” - Novel of the Year

“2011 Best First Novel, The Danish Academy of Crime Fiction”

De hengivne 

"De hengivne" is Anders Rønnow Klarlunds debut novel. It was published in Danish on October 6, 2009.

The book is 235 pages long.

Feature films

The Eighteenth 

The Eighteenth was written and directed by Anders Rønnow Klarlund.

Awards 
The International critics’ award
Best Film, Mannheim-Heidelberg International Filmfestival:
Best Film, Nordic Filmdays: The Eighteenth
Best Film, Valencia International Filmfestival: The Eighteenth

Additional information 

Original title: Den attende

Year of publication: 1996

Country of production: Denmark

Duration: 96 min.

Director: Anders Rønnow Klarlund

Manuscript: Anders Rønnow Klarlund

Cast: Sanne Grauland, Rasmus Botoft, Niels Anders Thorn, Rebecca Sørensen, Lotte Bergstrøm, Søren Christensen, Finn Nielsen, Ulla Håkansson

Producer: Thomas Mai

Cinematography: Eigil Bryld

Music: Martin Klarlund

The Possessed

Additional information 

Director: Anders Rønnow Klarlund

Original title: Besat

Year of publication: 1999

Country of production: Denmark/Norway

Duration: 99 min.

Awards
Meliés D´or : Best European Thriller 2000
 
Best Director, Rome Fantasy Festival
 
Meliés D´argent

Strings 

Trailer link: https://www.youtube.com/watch?v=oHa1BqcNYQc

Awards 
Best children/youth film:  STRINGS – Denmark 2006
The Citizen Kane Award: STRINGS
Meliés D´argent: Best film: STRINGS

The Secret Society of Fine Arts 
Summary

A group of underground artists blow up Berlin’s zoological museum and declare it “a work of art”. Their goal is to set beauty free. The unrelenting passion fascinates actress Eva Kovacs, who joins the group. But how do you draw the line between art and terror? Does it take cynical terror attacks to attract the media’s attention? And have we become so distanced and cold that it takes something completely extraordinary to make us really sense the world again?

Additional information: https://web.archive.org/web/20121015051823/http://thessofa.com/uk

Awards 
Audience Award: Geneva International film festival

Best film: Geneva International film festival

References

External links
 

1971 births
Living people
Danish television directors
Danish film directors
Danish male screenwriters
Danish male novelists